The Australian cricket team toured New Zealand from 26 February to 31 March 2010. The tour consisted of two Twenty20s (T20), five One Day Internationals (ODIs) and two Tests. Due to sponsorship, the tour was referred to as The National Bank Series, with the New Zealand team's major sponsor the National Bank of New Zealand, and the Australian team's major sponsor Victoria Bitter.

The T20 series was tied, with each team winning one of the matches. The Chappell–Hadlee Trophy—awarded to the winner of the annual series of ODI matches between the two nations—was retained by Australia for the third series in a row by defeating New Zealand 3–2. The Trans-Tasman Trophy—awarded to the winner of each test series between Australia and New Zealand—was retained by Australia for the eighth series in a row, after they defeated New Zealand 2–0.

The next series for both teams will be the 2010 ICC World Twenty20 in April and May.

Squads

Notes

T20I series

1st T20I

2nd T20I

Both of these Twenty20 Matches were preceded by Twenty20 Matches between the New Zealand and Australian Women's teams. These Women's Matches were played at the same venues as the Men's Matches.

Chappell–Hadlee Trophy

1st ODI

2nd ODI

3rd ODI

4th ODI

5th ODI

Trans–Tasman Trophy

1st Test

2nd Test

Media coverage

Television

Sky Sport (Live) – New Zealand
FOX Sports (Live) – Australia
SET Max (Live) – India (Except 5th ODI)
SET Pix (Live) – India (Only 5th ODI)
Sky Sports (Live) – United Kingdom and Ireland
DirecTV (Live) – United States of America
Supersport (Live) – South Africa, Kenya and Zimbabwe
Arab Digital Distribution (Live) – United Arab Emirates

References 

2010 in Australian cricket
2009–10 New Zealand cricket season
2009-10
International cricket competitions in 2009–10
2010 in New Zealand cricket